Henry Jones (died 1792) was a British politician and clothier in London. He was Member of Parliament for Devizes from 1780 to 1784. He took the place of Charles Garth, elected in September 1780, when Garth accepted a government office, becoming therefore MP in November 1780.

References

1792 deaths
British MPs 1780–1784
Members of the Parliament of Great Britain for English constituencies
Year of birth unknown